Hedvig Sophie Karsten (3 September 1783 – 25 February 1862) was a Swedish ballerina and artist (painter).

Born to opera singers Christoffer Christian Karsten and Sophie Stebnowska, she was the sister of painter Elisabeth Charlotta Karsten.

Sophie Karsten became a dancer at the Royal Swedish Ballet in the Royal Swedish Opera in Stockholm. In 1805, she was appointed premier dancer. She was also active as a painter, and participated in the exhibitions of the Royal Swedish Academy of Arts in Stockholm between 1802 and 1804. Her most noted painting was a mountain landscape.

She married Filippo Taglioni in 1803, and became the mother of the ballerina Marie Taglioni.

References 
 Dahlberg och Hagström, Svenskt konstlexikon. Allhems Förlag (1953) Malmö. (in Swedish)
 Osmo Durchman, Finska anor inom furstehus (in Swedish)
  (in Swedish)

Swedish ballerinas
19th-century Swedish painters
19th-century Swedish ballet dancers
1783 births
1862 deaths
Royal Swedish Ballet dancers
Swedish people of Polish descent
Swedish women painters